Peter John Smith (born 27 May 1935) is an English former professional footballer. He played professionally for Gillingham between 1958 and 1960, and in total made 39 appearances in the English Football League, scoring two goals.

References

1935 births
Living people
English footballers
Gillingham F.C. players
Margate F.C. players
Footballers from Balham
Association football midfielders
English Football League players